Kokkala may refer to:
 Kokkala, builder of the Vidyanath  temple in Khajurao
 Kokalla II (r. c. 990-1015 CE), Indian king from the Kalachuri dynasty of Tripuri
Kokkalai, a town in Kerala, India
Kokkala, Kavala, a ruined town in Kavala regional unit, Greece, at   
Kokkala, Laconia, a village in the municipality East Mani, Laconia, Greece